Palazzo Contarini Pisani is a palace in Venice, located in the Cannaregio district, overlooking the left side of the Grand Canal, between Palazzo Boldù and Casa Levi Morenos, in front of Ca' Corner della Regina.

History
Dating back to the 16th century and rebuilt from Veneto-Byzantine structure, the palace belonged to the Contarini family, who wanted to combine it with an adjacent building, but this plan was never realized. This is partly why the palazzo looks prosaic and outwardly unremarkable.

Architecture
The four-story building has a semicircular arched portal with access to the water, framed by two rectangular and two square window openings, and rustication in the corners. The first floor is separated from the upper ones by a massive cornice, which turns the floor into a kind of loggia. The triforas in the middle of the facade emphasize the central axis of the whole composition. All openings are framed with Istrian stone; corner stones on both sides of the facade are also made of this material up to the middle of the second floor. On the right side, the first floor ends with a lonely, strange in proportion, but typically Venetian column with a fancy capital.

Gallery

References

Palaces in Sestiere Cannaregio
Palaces on the Grand Canal (Venice)
Buildings and structures completed in the 16th century
Medieval Italian architecture
Renaissance architecture in Venice